Sachin: The Ultimate Winner is an  Hindi film starring Ved Thapar, Shivani Sharma and Dhruv Raj. The film is written, directed, and produced by Dweep Raj Kochhar. Actor Ved Thapar, who was seen in the role of Raja in the television serial Raja Aur Rancho, plays Sachin's coach.

Summary
Sachin in a kid who wants to become a cricketer like his namesake Sachin Tendulkar. When a crash leaves him paralyzed, he is encouraged by his coach and classmates to come back.

Cast
 Mukul Cheeru as Sachin
 Dr. Ved Thapar as Sachin’s coach
 Shivani Sharma as Sachin’s mother
 Dhruv Raj as the opponent's coach
 Dweep Raj Kochhar as Nihaal Singh, Sachin’s milkman
 Muskan Panwar as Sachin’s sister
 Naved Sharma as the opponent team captain

References

External links
 Sachin: The Ultimate Winner at Bollywood Hungama
 
 Sachin The Ultimate winner at movietalkies

2023 drama films
2023 films
Upcoming Hindi-language films
Upcoming Indian films